Songs from the Deep Forest is an album by Northern Irish singer-songwriter Duke Special. In May 2006, it was released as a limited edition set of six 7" vinyl discs and then re-released as a single CD in October of the same year. It was nominated for a 2007 Meteor Music Award for best Irish album, and for the 2007 Choice Music Prize.

On October 1, 2007, a special 2-disc edition was released, which included the new song "Our Love Goes Deeper Than This", featuring Neil Hannon and Romeo Stodart. The bonus disc included songs from a live BBC performance recorded in Belfast.

Track listing
All songs written by Duke Special, except where otherwise indicated.

Wake Up Scarlett
Everybody Wants a Little Something 
Brixton Leaves (Duke Special, Ben Hales)
Freewheel
No Cover Up 
Portrait
Last Night I Nearly Died (But I Woke Up Just in Time) 
Ballad of a Broken Man 
Salvation Tambourine
Something Might Happen
Slip of a Girl (Paul Wilkinson)
This Could Be My Last Day

Earlier versions of "Last Night I Nearly Died (But I Woke Up Just in Time)", "Freewheel" and "Wake up Scarlett" appeared on Adventures in Gramophone, and an earlier version of "Portrait" appeared on the Your Vandal EP.

Bonus Version 
A special "Bonus Version of the Album" contains two additional tracks:
Salvation Tambourine (Demo)
And It Stoned Me (Live) (Van Morrison)

Special Edition

Disc 1
Wake Up Scarlett
Everybody Wants a Little Something
Brixton Leaves (Special, Hales)
Our Love Goes Deeper Than This (Special, Wilkinson) - featuring Neil Hannon and Romeo Stodart
Freewheel
No Cover Up
Portrait
Last Night I Nearly Died (But I Woke Up Just in Time)
Ballad of a Broken Man
Salvation Tambourine
Something Might Happen
Slip of a Girl (Wilkinson)
This Could Be My Last Day

Disc 2
Overture (BBC Live Version) (Andrew Skeet)
Brixton Leaves (BBC Live Version) (Special, Hales)
Last Night I Nearly Died (BBC Live Version)
Portrait (BBC Live Version)
Wake Up Scarlett (BBC Live Version)
Regarding the Moonlight in Eastbourne (BBC Live Version)
Salvation Tambourine (BBC Live Version)
No Cover Up (BBC Live Version)
I Let You Down (BBC Live Version) (Special, Brian Houston)
Freewheel (BBC Live Version)

2006 albums
Duke Special albums
V2 Records albums